Robert Jacob Samuelson (born December 23, 1945) is a conservative journalist for The Washington Post, where he has written about business and economic issues since 1977. He was a columnist for Newsweek magazine from 1984 to 2011.

Career
He began his career in journalism as a reporter on the business desk of The Washington Post in 1969 and left the paper to become a freelancer in 1973. His work has appeared in The Sunday Times, The New Republic and the Columbia Journalism Review. He joined the National Journal in 1976, where he wrote the "Economic Focus" column. He was a contributing editor there from 1981 to 1984, when he left to write for Newsweek. At age 75, Samuelson posted his last op-ed article in The Washington Post on September 14, 2020.

Personal life
Samuelson was born in New York City and raised in nearby White Plains, New York. He received his bachelor's degree in 1967 from Harvard University, where he concentrated in government. He and his wife, Judith Herr, live in Bethesda, Maryland and have three children.

Journalism awards
Samuelson has received:
1993 John Hancock Award for Best Business and Financial Columnist
National Headliner Award for Feature Column on a Single Subject in both 1992 and 1993; another in 1987 for Best Special Interest Column
Gerald Loeb Awards for Commentary in 1994, 1986 and 1983; Loeb finalist in 1988 for his columns on the October 1987 Wall Street crash
An Alicia Patterson Journalism Fellowship in 1982 to research and write about the changes in the U.S. economy since World War II.
1981 National Magazine Award

Books by Samuelson

The Good Life and Its Discontents: The American Dream in the Age of Entitlement, (Random House: 1995) 368 pages, 
Untruth: Why the Conventional Wisdom Is (Almost Always) Wrong, (Random House: 2001) 304 pages  (trade paperback edition)
The Great Inflation and Its Aftermath: The Past and Future of American Affluence, (Random House: 2008) 336 pages

Notes

External links

C-SPAN Q&A interview with Samuelson, January 2, 2011

1945 births
Living people
Harvard University alumni
American male journalists
American columnists
American economics writers
Newsweek people
The Washington Post people
Gerald Loeb Award winners for Columns, Commentary, and Editorials